German submarine U-752 was a Type VIIC U-boat built for Nazi Germany's Kriegsmarine for service during World War II.

Design
German Type VIIC submarines were preceded by the shorter Type VIIB submarines. U-752 had a displacement of  when at the surface and  while submerged. She had two shafts and two  propellers.

U-752 was fitted with five  torpedo tubes (four fitted at the bow and one at the stern), fourteen torpedoes, one  SK C/35 naval gun, 220 rounds, and a  C/30 anti-aircraft gun. The boat had a complement of between forty-four and sixty.

Service history
She served with 3rd U-boat Flotilla from 24 May 1941 until 23 May 1943 under the command of Korvettenkapitän Karl-Ernst Schroeter. U-752 completed nine wartime patrols and sank nine ships and damaged one.

Fate
Thirty-two days into her ninth patrol, on 23 May 1943, U-752 was attacked by Fairey Swordfish aircraft attached to the British escort carrier  in the mid-Atlantic. A Rocket Spear, a new weapon with a solid cast iron head, entered and left the pressure hull leaving large holes, thus preventing the U-boat from diving. At the arrival of enemy surface craft, the surviving crew of 17 scuttled the boat and abandoned ship. This was the first success of the Rocket Spear. U-752 sank with 30 men. Heinz Krey was one of them.

Wolfpacks
U-752 took part in ten wolfpacks, namely:
 Westwall (2 – 12 March 1942) 
 Hai (3 – 21 July 1942) 
 Schlagetot (9 – 21 November 1942) 
 Habicht (10 – 19 January 1943) 
 Haudegen (19 January – 9 February 1943) 
 Amsel 3 (4 – 6 May 1943) 
 Rhein (7 – 10 May 1943) 
 Elbe 1 (10 – 14 May 1943) 
 Oder (17 – 19 May 1943) 
 Mosel (19 – 23 May 1943)

Summary of raiding history

References

Bibliography

External links

1941 ships
U-boats commissioned in 1941
World War II submarines of Germany
Ships built in Wilhelmshaven
U-boats sunk in 1943
U-boats sunk by British aircraft
World War II shipwrecks in the Atlantic Ocean
German Type VIIC submarines
Maritime incidents in May 1943